Westermoskee is a mosque located in Amsterdam, Netherlands. It is situated on the bank of the canalized river Schinkel in the Chassébuurt in De Baarsjes in the borough of Amsterdam-West. With a floor surface of 800 m2 and a capacity of 1700 people, it is the largest mosque in the Netherlands.

History 
The building was designed by French traditional architects Marc and Nada Breitman, winners of the 2018 Driehaus Prize and part of the New Classical movement. Construction started in 2013 and the building was completed in 2015. The mosque was unofficially opened on 1 April 2016.

Architecture 
The mosque is built in the Ottoman style, with a single minaret and a large Ottoman styled main dome.

References

External links 
 
  

2015 establishments in the Netherlands
Amsterdam-West
Mosques completed in 2015
Mosques in the Netherlands
New Classical architecture
Religious buildings and structures in Amsterdam
Mosque buildings with domes
21st-century religious buildings and structures in the Netherlands